The Way It Is (also known as The Way It Is or Eurydice in the Avenues) is a 1985 American film directed by Eric Mitchell. It marked Steve Buscemi and Vincent Gallo's film debuts.

Premise
A group of actors are rehearsing for a play when the lead actress in the play turns up dead.

References

External links

1985 films
American independent films
American black-and-white films
1980s English-language films
1980s American films